The Minister for Small Business is a minister of the New South Wales Government within The Treasury and has responsibilities for matters relating to small business policy and regulation in New South Wales. The current Minister for Small Business, since 31 July 2022, is Victor Dominello.

The minister supports the Minister for Finance, presently Damien Tudehope and the Treasurer, presently Matt Kean.

Ultimately the minister is responsible to the Parliament of New South Wales.

Role and responsibilities 
Small business was first represented at a portfolio level in the sixth Wran ministry, with the appointment of George Paciullo as the Minister for Small Business and Technology, with Paciullo also holding the portfolio of Industry and Decentralisation. The portfolio was responsible for promoting the well-being, growth and development of the small business sector in New South Wales through the Office of Small Business. In the eighth Wran ministry small business was combined with industry to form the portfolio of Industry and Small Business.

Small Business first became a separate portfolio in the Unsworth ministry, with the appointment of Deirdre Grusovin who also held the portfolio of Consumer Affairs. In addition to the Office of Small Business, the portfolio was responsible for Small Business Development Corporation which undertook research and investigated matters relating to the small business section of the economy and aimed at expanding the effectiveness of existing government assistance and advisory programs. The portfolio was replaced in the first Grieiner ministry by the portfolio of Business and Consumer Affairs.

List of ministers

See also 

 List of New South Wales government agencies

References 

Small Business